Kronika Polska (Polish for Polish Chronicle) may refer to:

Chronica Polonorum (disambiguation)
Kronika Polska (1597) by Marcin Bielski
, a fake Polish chronicle forged by Przybysław Dyjamentowski
Kronika Polska, Litewska, Żmudzka i wszystkiej Rusi (1582) by Maciej Stryjkowski

See also
Annales seu cronicae incliti Regni Poloniae  (Roczniki, czyli kroniki słynnego Królestwa Polskiego), known as the Annals of  Jan Długosz
Chronicon Polono-Silesiacum 
Wielkopolska Chronicle

Polish chronicles